The eastern moa (Emeus crassus) is an extinct species of moa. When the first specimens were originally described by Richard Owen, they were placed within the genus Dinornis as three different species, but, was later split off into their own genus, Emeus.  E. crassus is currently the only species of Emeus, as the other two species, E. casuarinus and E. huttonii are now regarded as synonyms of E. crassus. It has been long suspected that the "species" described as Emeus huttonii and E. crassus were males and females, respectively, of a single species. This has been confirmed by analysis for sex-specific genetic markers of DNA extracted from bone material; the females of E. crassus were 15-25% larger than males. This phenomenon — reverse size dimorphism — is not uncommon amongst ratites, being also very pronounced in kiwis.

Description
 
Like other moa, it had no vestigial wing bones, hair-like feathers (beige in this case), a long neck and large, powerful legs with very short, strong tarsi. It also had a sternum without a keel and a distinctive palate. Its feet were exceptionally wide compared to other moas, making it a very slow creature. Soft parts of its body, such as tracheal rings (cartilage) or remnants of skin were found, as well as single bones and complete skeletons. As they neared the head, the feathers grew shorter, until they finally turned into coarse hair-like feathers; the head itself was probably bald.

Range and habitat
 
Eastern moa lived only on the South Island, and lived in the lowlands (forests, grasslands, dunelands, and shrublands). Human colonists hunted Emeus into extinction with relative ease. Like almost all moa, it was gone by the year 1500.

Footnotes

References

External links
Eastern Moa. Emeus crassus. by Paul Martinson. Artwork produced for the book Extinct Birds of New Zealand, by Alan Tennyson, Te Papa Press, Wellington, 2006

Extinct flightless birds
Extinct birds of New Zealand
Late Quaternary prehistoric birds
Ratites
Holocene extinctions